Michael J. Abel (born 1950) is a former Republican Party lawmaker from Queens, New York. A member of the New York City Council, he represented the 19th district, which includes neighborhoods of Bayside West, College Point, Whitestone, Bayside, Little Neck, Douglaston, Beechhurst, Malba and Auburndale. He also served as council minority leader in 1994.

References 

Living people
1950 births
New York City Council members
New York (state) Republicans
Politicians from Queens, New York
20th-century American politicians